The 2020 EADC Tour series was due to consist of 6 darts tournaments on the 2020 PDC Pro Tour, but only 3 events took place, owing to the COVID-19 pandemic.

Results

EADC Tour 1
EADC Tour 1 was contested on Saturday 22 February 2020 at the Omega Plaza Business Center in Moscow.

EADC Tour 2
EADC Tour 2 was contested on Saturday 22 February 2020 at the Omega Plaza Business Center in Moscow.

EADC Tour 3
EADC Tour 3 was contested on Sunday 23 February 2020 at the Omega Plaza Business Center in Moscow.

References

2020 in darts
2020 PDC Pro Tour